Protein FAM89A (family with sequence similarity 89, member A) is a protein which in humans is encoded by the FAM89A gene. It is also known as chromosome 1 open reading frame 153 (C1orf153). Highest FAM89A gene expression is observed in the placenta and adipose tissue. Though its function is largely unknown, FAM89A is found to be differentially expressed in response to interleukin exposure, and it is implicated in immune responses pathways and various pathologies such as atherosclerosis and glioma cell expression.

Gene 
The gene FAM89A is a protein-encoding gene in humans, located on minus strand of chromosome 1, map position 1q42.2. It is also known as chromosome 1 open reading frame 153 (C1orf153). The primary mRNA transcript for the FAM89A gene is 1,503 base pairs in length. There are no other transcript variants for FAM89A. The gene is composed of two exons flanking one large intronic region. FAM89A is neighboring the genes TRIM67 (Tripartite Motif Containing 67), located downstream of FAM89A on the plus strand of chromosome 1, and ARV1 (ARV1 Homolog, Fatty Acid Homeostasis Modulator), located upstream of FAM89A on the plus strand of chromosome 1.

Protein

Biochemistry 
The FAM89A protein is 184 amino acids in length, and it has a predicted molecular mass of 18.6kDa and a predicted isoelectric point of 5.64. Two small repetitive sequences were found twice within the protein sequence; GARAA and ASGG. Composition of FAM89A protein is notable for its abundance of four amino acids; Leucine (14.1%), Glycine (12.0%), Alanine (11.4%) and Serine (11.4%). FAM89A shows five periodic repeats of leucine residues at every seventh amino acid position at positions 81-115, which is characteristic of its predicted leucine zipper structural motif.

Conserved Domains 
FAM89A contains a conserved leucine-rich adapter protein domain (LURAP) called PF14854, located at amino acid positions 84-122. The LURAP superfamily of proteins are activators of the canonical NF-κB pathway, involved in promoting antigen presentation in dendritic cells and the production of pro-inflammatory cytokines.

Secondary Structure 
FAM89A is predicted to be 40% alpha helix, 11% extended strand, and 49% random coils. The conserved LURAP domain is predicted to form an alpha helix.

Tertiary Structure 
FAM89A tertiary structure has not yet been determined by X-ray crystallography. I-TASSER software predicts dimerization of alpha helix monomers, indicative of the leucine zipper motif.

Gene Level Regulation

Promoter 
The FAM89A promoter region is 1,104 base pairs in length. It contains binding sites for various transcription factors, including TFIIB (RNA polymerase II transcription factor IIB), PLAG1 (pleomorphic adenoma gene 1), MZF1 (myeloid zinc finger 1 factors), and SP1 (GC-Box factors SP1/GC).

Expression pattern 
FAM89A's highest expression is observed in the placenta and adipose tissue. RNA-sequencing data also reveals moderate FAM89A expression in the adrenal gland, lung, skin, spleen, and breast. Microarray hybridization supports high FAM89A expression in the placenta and moderate expression in the lung, spinal cord, skin, adrenal gland, and retina.

Protein Level Regulation

Subcellular Localization 
The FAM89A protein is suggested to be localized in the nucleoplasm, Golgi apparatus, and/or vesicles. Reinhardt’s method for cytoplasmic/nuclear discrimination in PSORT II search results predict nuclear localization with a reliability score of 89. Prediction for localization of FAM89A is highest in the nucleus (52.2%) followed by the mitochondria (34.8%), then the cytoskeleton (8.7%), followed by the cytoplasm having the lowest score (4.3%). PredictProtein tool supports the prediction of subcellular localization in the nucleus.

Post-translational Modifications

Phosphorylation/O-Linked β-N-acetylglucosamine 
FAM89A has three predicted phosphorylation sites located at amino acid positions 30, 32, and 168 that are conserved in distant orthologs. The predicted phosphorylation site at position 32 is experimentally verified at position 28 in its paralog, FAM89B. There is a possible competitive binding site for phosphorylation and O-linked β-N-acetylglucosamine (O-GlcNAc) at position 158, supporting localization of FAM89A in the nucleoplasm.

Glycation 
NetGlycate 1.0 server predicts two glycation sites at positions 57 and 95. The residues are conserved in distant FAM89A orthologs. Glycation of these lysines is linked to being an important factor in atherosclerosis due to its production of advanced glycation end products (AGEs) which are engulfed by macrophages and taken into the arterial wall.

SUMOylation 
SUMOplot predicts SUMO (Small Ubiquitin-like Modifier) protein sites at position 83. The residue is conserved in distant FAM89A orthologs.

Homology/Evolution

Paralogs 
An important human paralog of FAM89A is FAM89B, located on human chromosome 11 at map position 11q13.1. FAM89B is also known as, Leucine Repeat Adaptor Protein 25 (LRAP25) and Mammary Tumor Virus Receptor Homolog 1 (MTVR1). Orthologs of FAM89A, but not FAM89B, are present in bivalves, crinoids, hemichordates, starfish, and horseshoe crabs. Orthologs of FAM89B, but not FAM89A, are present in brachiopods and priapulids, The paralogs likely split around 736 million years ago.

Orthologs 
FAM89A is largely conserved in Eutelostomi (bony vertebrates). Its orthologs can be found in mammals, amphibians, reptiles, birds, fish, and various insects. Distant FAM89A orthologs are present in octopus, scallop, ants, and bees.

Evolution 
The rate of accumulation of amino acid changes relative to the genes Fibrinogen and Cytochrome c indicates that FAM89A is evolving rapidly, using the molecular clock technique.

Interacting Proteins 
FAM89A is experimentally determined to interact with the UBXN2B (UBX Domain Protein 2B), an adaptor protein involved in biogenesis in the Golgi apparatus and endoplasmic reticulum (ER) and assembly and maintenance of the ER during the cell cycle

Clinical Significance

Pathology and Disease Association 
FAM89A is suggested to be involved in modulating the effects of smoking on the risk of atherosclerotic plaque burden. In a study conducted in 2014, a cohort of 264 Caribbean Hispanics with varying smoking frequencies were evaluated for carotid plaque burden and 11 single nucleotide polymorphism (SNP) were identified that had a notable interaction with smoking effects on carotid plaque burden, including SNP rs6700792, located within the FAM89A gene.

FAM89A is also suggested to be involved in discriminating viral and bacterial infection in febrile patients. A 2016 study conducted at the Division of Infectious Disease in the Imperial College of London evaluated blood-based transcriptomic biomarkers and revealed that febrile patients with bacterial infection displayed increased expression of FAM89A.

A 2019 study concerning FAM89A was directed on genes that possess methylation sites that relate to causing gliomas. The researchers found that abnormal expression of FAM89A correlated with glioma gene expression profiling studies.

Microarray hybridization data revealed slight decrease in FAM89A expression in response to airway epithelial cell exposure to interleukin 13 and CD8+ T lymphocyte exposure to interleukin 10.

References 

Genes on human chromosome 1
Genes
Proteins
Human proteins
Genetics